Charaxes lasti, the silver-striped charaxes, is a butterfly in the family Nymphalidae. It is found in Kenya and Tanzania.

Description
lasti Smith male: the black spots on the upperside of the forewing which divide the median band are free or nearly so; the hindwing above is almost 
unicolorous red-yellow, only before the distal margin with a row of black submarginal spots. The female has a whitish yellow median band, which on the forewing is already divided into two branches from cellule 2, the proximal one composed of very irregular spots; the distal part of the forewing is black with small red-yellow marginal spots; the basal part of both wings yellow-brown; the hindwing with a broad black submarginal band before the red-yellow distal margin. Manicaland to Mombasa in British East Africa.

Biology
The habitat consists of coastal and sub-coastal forests and heavy woodland.

The larvae feed on Afzelia quanzensis, Paramacrolobium coeruleum, Julbernardia magnistipulata, and Macrolobium species.

Taxonomy
Charaxes cynthia group.

The group members are:
Charaxes cynthia similar to Charaxes lucretius
Charaxes protoclea
Charaxes boueti close to next
Charaxes lasti close to last
Charaxes alticola

Related to Charaxes cynthia, Charaxes macclounii and Charaxes boueti

Subspecies
Charaxes lasti lasti (Kenya: southern coast and the Shimba Hills, north-eastern Tanzania) 
Charaxes lasti kimbozae Kielland, 1984 (eastern Tanzania)
Charaxes lasti magomberae Kielland, 1984 (eastern Tanzania)

References

Victor Gurney Logan Van Someren (1970). Revisional notes on African Charaxes (Lepidoptera: Nymphalidae). Part VI. Bulletin of the British Museum (Natural History) (Entomology) 197-250.

External links
Images of C. lasti lasti Royal Museum for Central Africa (Albertine Rift Project)
Charaxes lasti images at Consortium for the Barcode of Life
External images

Butterflies described in 1889
lasti
Butterflies of Africa
Taxa named by Henley Grose-Smith